Geovane Henrique Pereira de Souza (born 17 October 1996), known as Geovane, is a Brazilian professional footballer who plays as a right back for Maringá.

References

External links

1996 births
Living people
Footballers from Curitiba
Brazilian footballers
Association football defenders
Campeonato Brasileiro Série A players
Coritiba Foot Ball Club players